The Sultan Hussein Cup (1917–1938) was the first local Egyptian football competition. It preceded the Egyptian Cup & the regional leagues (Cairo, Alexandria, Bahary & Canal).

In 1916, the idea of establishing a football league in the Sultanate of Egypt was proposed. The league would include Egyptian teams and teams from the allies' military clubs, including the British. The competition was named after Sultan Hussein Kamel.

Initially, Al Ahly refused to take part. This left Zamalek as the only Egyptian club. In 1918, Al Ahly decided to take part as a sign of resistance to the British and a way to display the Egyptian presence in the sport.

List of Champion

See also 
Egypt Cup

External links 
Egyption Sports- Sultan Cup
Al-Ahram Weekly- Pride of Place

Defunct football competitions in Egypt